Sharon English is a Canadian writer. Her short story collection Zero Gravity was a shortlisted nominee for the ReLit Awards, and a longlisted nominee for the Scotiabank Giller Prize, in 2007.

Originally from London, Ontario, she is currently based in Toronto, where she teaches creative writing at the University of Toronto's Innis College.

Works
Uncomfortably Numb (2002)
Zero Gravity (2006)
Night in the World (2022)

References

External links
 Sharon English's website

1965 births
Canadian women short story writers
Canadian women novelists
Writers from London, Ontario
Living people
21st-century Canadian women writers
21st-century Canadian short story writers
21st-century Canadian novelists